Serge Thill (born 29 January 1969) is a Luxembourgish former footballer who played for the Luxembourg national team.

Club career
Thill began his senior career in his native Luxembourg in 1991, playing for Union Luxembourg. In 1993, Thill signed for Belgian club RSC Athusien. In 1997, Thill returned to Luxembourg to sign for CS Grevenmacher. Thill stayed at Grevenmacher for five seasons, winning the Luxembourg National Division in his final season at the club.

International career
Thill played 14 times for the Luxembourg national team between 1992 and 1998, making his debut in a 3–2 defeat against Turkey.

Personal life
Thill is married to former athlete Nathalie Thill. Together, they have had three sons that have gone onto represent Luxembourg at international level: Olivier Thill, Sébastien Thill and Vincent Thill.

Honours
Union Luxembourg
Luxembourg National Division: 1991–92

CS Grevenmacher
Luxembourg National Division: 2002–03
Luxembourg Cup: 1997–98, 2002–03

References

1969 births
Living people
Association football midfielders
Association football forwards
Luxembourgian footballers
Luxembourgian expatriate footballers
Luxembourg international footballers
Luxembourgian expatriate sportspeople in Belgium
Expatriate footballers in Belgium
Luxembourg National Division players
Union Luxembourg
CS Grevenmacher players
Luxembourgian football managers
FC Progrès Niederkorn managers